Qeshlaq-e Ziba (also Romanized as Qeshlāq-e Zībā) is a village in Javersiyan Rural District, Qareh Chay District, Khondab County, Markazi Province, Iran. At the 2006 census, its population was 41, in 7 families.

References 

Populated places in Khondab County